Luis Francisco Diaz Colon, also known as "Pickie" Diaz, is a Puerto Rican former politician who served as mayor of Yabucoa. He belonged to the statehood-seeking PNP party. Diaz Colon was also the executive director of the National Parks Company.

Personal 
Born to Emilio Díaz Lebron and Margarita Colón, he is the brother of Emilio Diaz Colon.

See also 
List of Puerto Ricans
Mayors in Puerto Rico

External links

1952 births
Living people
People from Yabucoa, Puerto Rico
Mayors of places in Puerto Rico
New Progressive Party (Puerto Rico) politicians